The arch of Cabo San Lucas is a distinctive granitic rock formation at the southern tip of Cabo San Lucas, which is itself the extreme southern end of Mexico's Baja California Peninsula.  The arch is locally known as "El Arco," which means "the arch" in Spanish, or "Land's End."

It is here that the Pacific Ocean becomes the Gulf of California.

This area is widely used in hotel advertising in the Los Cabos Corridor. This spot is a popular gathering area for sea lions and is frequented by tourists. It is three stories tall and was formed from natural erosion. The Arch of Cabo San Lucas is adjacent to Lovers Beach on the Sea of Cortez side and Divorce Beach on the rougher Pacific Ocean side. The Arch is accessible by land if you approach it by placing yourself at the beach of the last hotel on the Pacific ( Finisterra )
You will have to climb some big rocks, once you do that, you will be at the very tip of the peninsula and a few steps from El arco.

Basement rock in Los Cabos formed through intrusive igneous processes c. 115 million years ago, during the Cretaceous period.

References

Natural arches
Rock formations of Mexico
Landforms of Baja California Sur
Cabo San Lucas
Landmarks in Mexico